Ardouval is a commune in the Seine-Maritime department in the Normandy region in north-western France.

Geography

Population

Places of interest
 The church of St.Marguerite, dating from the eighteenth century.
 The château des Hêtres Roux, dating from the eighteenth century
 The forest of Eawy.
 V1 rocket site

See also
Communes of the Seine-Maritime department

References

External links

History and images of the V1 rocket site Val Ygot near Ardouval

Communes of Seine-Maritime